Rape of the Earth is a second album from French neoclassical guitarist Patrick Rondat.

Track listing

Personnel
Pascal Mulot - Bass
Christian Namour - Drums
Patrick Rondat - Guitar
Didier Erard - Keyboards

References

External links
Rape of the Earth at Deezer
Rape of the Earth at Discog

1991 albums
Patrick Rondat albums